Robert Kenneth Maguire (31 March 1923 – 14 October 2000) was the 8th Anglican Bishop of Montreal for twelve years.

Born the son of teacher Robert Maguire on 31 March 1923, he was educated at Trinity College, Dublin before studying for ordination and embarking on an ecclesiastical career that shuttled between Ireland and Canada.  After curacies in Armagh and Montreal, he was Dean of Residence at his old college until 1960.

Returning to Canada he became Rector of the Cathedral Church in Montreal  before becoming Diocesan Bishop in 1963. During his long retirement he was an honorary assistant bishop in New York and Florida.

See also
List of Anglican Bishops of Montreal

References

1923 births
Alumni of Trinity College Dublin
Anglican bishops of Montreal
2000 deaths
20th-century Anglican Church of Canada bishops
Irish emigrants to Canada